The 2011 Kuurne–Brussels–Kuurne took place on 27 February 2011, a day after Omloop Het Nieuwsblad. It was the 64th edition of the international classic Kuurne–Brussels–Kuurne. Australian Chris Sutton won the race in a bunch sprint.

Results

References

Kuurne–Brussels–Kuurne
Kuurne-Brussels-Kuurne
2011 in Belgian sport